Enemy was an American band fronted by guitarist and vocalist Troy Van Leeuwen (also of Queens of the Stone Age), with bassist Eddie Nappi (Handsome, Mark Lanegan Band), and drummer Kelli Scott (Failure). Former Quicksand drummer Alan Cage was a founding member before being replaced by Scott. Van Leeuwen has described Enemy as his "big, dumb rock trio".

History 
The concept for Enemy originated following the demise of Troy Van Leeuwen's previous band, Failure. In the interim, Van Leeuwen had joined A Perfect Circle, and Enemy managed to record a five-song demo during his downtime from touring:

Taking the unusual step of offering to be signed by a record label by advertising for $250,000 on eBay, Enemy were ultimately signed by Control Group/TCG and released their debut album Hooray for Dark Matter in 2005.

Discography

References

External links
 Enemy's official website

American alternative metal musical groups
American post-hardcore musical groups
American musical trios